Russell Doig (born 17 January 1964) is a Scottish footballer, who played for East Stirlingshire, Leeds United, Peterborough United and Hartlepool United.

He later played for Halifax Town, Harrogate Town, Nuneaton Borough, Farsley Celtic and joined Mossley in August 1994, where he made 10 appearances and scored one goal.

References

1964 births
Living people
Association football wingers
Scottish footballers
St Mirren F.C. players
East Stirlingshire F.C. players
Leeds United F.C. players
Peterborough United F.C. players
Hartlepool United F.C. players
Nuneaton Borough F.C. players
Scottish Football League players
English Football League players
Footballers from North Ayrshire
Halifax Town A.F.C. players
Harrogate Town A.F.C. players
Farsley Celtic A.F.C. players
Mossley A.F.C. players
Sportspeople from Scottish islands